

Storms
Note:  indicates the name was retired after that usage in the respective basin

Hagibis
 2002 – a category 5 super typhoon that never affected land.
 2007  – traversed the Philippines twice.
 2014 – a tropical storm that, along with the southwest monsoon, brought heavy rainfall to the Philippines for nearly a week in June 2014. 
 2019 – a long-lived and violent Category 5 super typhoon that caused widespread destruction in Japan.

Hagupit
 2002 — made landfall west of Macau.
 2008 — a powerful cyclone that caused widespread destruction along its path in September 2008.
 2014  —  a category 5 super typhoon that traversed the Philippines.
 2020 – a category 1 typhoon that heavily impacted Eastern China and South Korea in August 2020.

Haikui
2012 – a Category 1 typhoon that made landfall in Zhejiang, China.
2017 – a weak storm that traversed the Philippine archipelagos of Luzon and Visayas.

Haima
 2004 – made landfall south of Shanghai.
 2011 – made landfall, first in Zhanjiang, Guangdong, China, and later in landfall over Hanoi, Vietnam.
 2016 – a powerful category 5 super typhoon that made landfall in Peñablanca, Cagayan of the Philippines and in Haifeng County, Shanwei in the Guangdong province of China.

Haishen
 2002 - a category 2 typhoon that did not affect land.
 2008 - a short lived tropical storm that formed off the Coast of Japan.
 2015 - churned in the open sea.
 2020 - a powerful tropical cyclone that became the first super typhoon of the 2020 Pacific typhoon season.

Haitang
2005 - struck both Taiwan and China.
2011 – meandered in the South China Sea.
2017 - both struck Taiwan and China a day after Typhoon Nesat made a landfall.
 2022 — churned in the open ocean.

Haiyan
2001 - a 2001 pacific typhoon season that hit Taiwan and Ryukyu Islands.
2007 - a tropical cyclone initially showing suptropical characterists.
2013  - a strong Category 5 super typhoon that caused extreme damage in the Philippines.

Hal
1978 – traversed the Cape York Peninsula in Australia and later the North Island in New Zealand.
1985 – made landfall northeast of Hong Kong.
1988 – remained over the open ocean.

Hale (2023) – a weak tropical cyclone that passed near New Caledonia did not cause serious damage.

Halima (2022) – a category 4 intense tropical cyclone without affecting any landmass.

Hallie
 1966 – made landfall in Mexico as a weakening tropical storm.
 1975 – paralleled near the coast of the southeastern United States before dissipating. 

Halola (2015) – a small but long-lived tropical cyclone in July 2015 that traveled 7,640 km (4,750 mi) across the Pacific Ocean, and made landfall over Kyushu as a tropical storm.

Halong
2002 –passed just south of Guam one week after Typhoon Chataan struck the island and left heavy damage, and struck Japan since tropical storm.
2008 – the fourth severe tropical storm named by the Japan Meteorological Agency (JMA).
2014 – a intense Typhoon in the Western Pacific basin in August 2014.
2019 – a category 5-equivalent super typhoon

Hamish
1999 – did not make landfall.
2009 – a severe tropical cyclone that caused extensive damage to the Great Barrier Reef and coastal Queensland, Australia, in 2009 that also caused two fatalities.

Hanna
1947 – Japan Meteorological Agency analyzed it as a tropical depression, not as a tropical storm.
 1959 – a strong hurricane that was only a threat to shipping.
 1997 – Japan Meteorological Agency analyzed it as a tropical depression, not as a tropical.
 2002 – a storm that made landfall in the United States.
 2007 – a storm that made landfall in Northern Vietnam. This storm was called Hanna by PAGASA.
 2008  – Category 1 hurricane that caused over 500 deaths in Haiti before traveling up the eastern U.S. coast in September 2008.
 2011 – churned in the open ocean.
 2014 – formed from the remnants of Tropical Storm Trudy from the East Pacific, dissipated, then reorganized, and made landfall in Nicaragua.
 2015 – impacted Taiwan and eastern China during August 2015.
 2019 – a strong typhoon that caused destruction to east China.
 2020 – Category 1 hurricane that impacted South Texas and Northeastern Mexico in late July 2020.

Harold
1997 – 
2020 – a category 5 severe tropical cyclone that caused widespread destruction in the Solomon Islands, Vanuatu, Fiji and Tonga in 2020 and resulting in 30 fatalities.

Herold (2020) – a powerful tropical cyclone that affected Madagascar and the Mascarene Islands in March 2020.

Harriet
 1952 – Category 3-equivalent typhoon that hit China.
 1956 – struck Japan.
 1959 – hit the Eastern Philippines as a Category 4-equivalent typhoon.
 1962 – hit Thailand, crossed into the North Indian Ocean where it hit East Pakistan.
 1964 made landfall on Madagascar.
 1965 – hit Taiwan as a Category 3-equivalent typhoon.
 1967
 1971 – traversed the Philippines, made landfall near the demilitarized zone between North and South Vietnam as a Category 4-equivalent typhoon.
 1977
 1982
 1992 – passed just south of North Keeling Island, strengthened into a Category 5 on the Australian tropical cyclone intensity scale, then crossed into the South-West Indian Ocean. 
 2003 – affected Western Australia.

Harvey
1981 – powerful Category 4 hurricane that stayed out at sea; caused no damage
1993 – stayed out at sea
1999 – a moderately strong system that caused flooding across South Florida
February 2005  – Category 3 cyclone that affected Queensland and Northern Territory
August 2005 – then-earliest eighth named storm since record-keeping began; surpassed by Hanna in 2020
2011 – last out of eight systems that failed to reach hurricane intensity in 2011; affected the Yucatán Peninsula as a tropical storm
2017  – powerful Category 4 hurricane that caused catastrophic flooding in Texas; tied with Katrina as the costliest Atlantic hurricane on record.

Hazel
 1948 – 
 1953 – 
 1954 – killed over 1000 people in Haiti, caused damage and death from South Carolina to Ontario.
 1963 – was downgraded after the fact; it never warranted a name.
 1964 – affected Madagascar.
 1965 – a weak east Pacific tropical cyclone that caused heavy damage in Mexico. 
 1979 –a powerful tropical cyclone caused $41 million in damage, among the costliest Western Australian cyclones.

Heather
 1969 – 
 1973 – a weak tropical storm caused no deaths or damage to any location in the coastal area of the Gulf of Tehuantepec.
 1977 – one of the worst tropical cyclones to affect Arizona on record.
 1992 – passed just south of North Keeling Island, strengthened into a Category 5 on the Australian tropical cyclone intensity scale, then crossed into the South-West Indian Ocean.

Hector
1978 – a category 4 hurricane.
1982 –  a category 1 hurricane.
1986 – caused significant flooding in western Australia
1988 – a category 4 hurricane strongest of its season.
1994 – a tropical storm that affected the Baja California Peninsula.
2000 – a Category 1 hurricane whose remnants affected Hawaii.
2006 – a Category 2 hurricane that did not affect land.
2012 – a tropical storm that affected Southwestern Mexico
2018 (A)
2018 (B) – a long-lived and strong Category 4 hurricane that crossed into the Western Pacific as a minimal tropical storm. 

Heidi
 1967 –
 1967 – 
 2012 – a small and moderately-powerful tropical cyclone that struck Western Australia in January 2012.

Helen
1945 –
1954 –
1958 –
1961 – 
1964 –
1966 –
1969 –
1972 – the most destructive tropical cyclone to strike Japan during the 1972 Pacific typhoon season. 
1974 –
1975 – hit Vietnam and  Philippines.
1992 –
1995 –
2004 – a powerful typhoon that struck southeastern Japan during the 2004 Pacific typhoon season.  
2007 – A Category 2 tropical cyclone that hit the Northern Territory in 2008 causing one fatality.
2008 – the seventh named storm and the fifth typhoon that was recognised by the Japan Meteorological Agency. 
2012 – made landfall in the Philippines and China.
2013 – affected Andhra Pradesh and Tamil Nadu
2014 – one of the most powerful tropical cyclones in the Mozambique Channel on record.
2016 – made landfall in Taiwan as a Category 4 typhoon.
2020 – a strong tropical storm that affected Mainland China, Hong Kong, Macau and Vietnam around the same area as Nuri two months prior. 

Helene
 1950 – stalled near Japan and struck China.
1958 – a powerful storm that grazed Cape Hatteras causing $11 million in damage.
 1969 – 
1988 – a Category 4 hurricane that stayed in the open sea, never threatening land.
2000 – entered the Caribbean Sea, made landfall at Fort Walton Beach, Florida, exited at the North Carolina coast and regained tropical storm strength heading northeast.
2006 – a Category 3 hurricane that stayed in the open ocean, never threatening land.
2012 – a tropical storm that affected Trinidad and Tobago and Mexico.
2018 – a Category 2 hurricane that formed between Cape Verde and West Africa.

Helga
 1966 –
 1970 – 
 1974 – did not affect land.

Henri
1979 – took unusual route around Yucatán Peninsula, caused no significant damage.
1985 – crossed Long Island as a weak storm, no damages or casualties.
2003 – caused heavy rainfall along Florida's Gulf coast, Delaware, and Pennsylvania, causing $19.6 million (USD) in damage.
2009 – moderate tropical storm that formed northeast of the Lesser Antilles, causing no known deaths or damage.
2015 – a short-lived tropical storm, did not affect land.
2021 – moved clockwise around Bermuda before taking aim on southern New England; briefly strengthened into a Category 1 hurricane, before weakening back to a tropical storm and making landfall in Westerly, Rhode Island.

Henriette
1983 – a category 4 hurricane that remained offshore Mexico
1989 – a weak tropical storm that remained at sea
1995 – briefly moved over the Baja California Peninsula, causing strong winds
2001 – strong tropical storm that did not affect land
2007 – caused heavy rainfall before and after moving ashore western Mexico
2013 – a category 2 hurricane, which moved into the Central Pacific
2019 – a weak and short-lived tropical storm that remained at sea

Henry
 2006 – a minimal typhoon which caused deadly flooding in southern China in August 2006.
 2020 – struck Japan and brought heavy rain.
 2014 – a category tropical cyclone to impact Taiwan in 2014.   
 2018 – a weak but very deadly tropical cyclone that devastated Vietnam and Laos in July 2018.
 2022 – a large and powerful tropical cyclone that impacted Japan and South Korea.

Herbie  – the only known tropical system to impact Western Australia during the month of May on record. The final cyclone of the 1987–88 Australian region cyclone season causing significant damage.

Hermine
1970 – tropical cyclone affected Reunion.
1980 – strong tropical storm that caused flooding throughout Mexico.
1998 – a weak tropical storm that struck Louisiana, causing minimal damage.
2004 - dmall tropical storm that caused very limited damage throughout New England.
2010 - formed from the remnants of Tropical Depression Eleven-E in the East Pacific; caused extensive flooding and tornadoes throughout Texas and Mexico.
2016 - minimal hurricane that became the first to strike Florida in nearly 11 years, causing extensive damage.
 2022 – a weak short-lived tropical storm that brought significant rainfall to the Canary Islands.

Hernan
1984 – minimal tropical storm with no effect on land.
1990 – high-end Category 4 hurricane, didn't affect land.
1996 – struck Mexico as a Category 1 hurricane, caused unknown amount of damage.
2002 – a category 5 hurricane that caused minor effects in Mexico and California
2008 – a category 3 hurricane, no land impact.
2014 – minimal hurricane with no effect on land.
2020 – a weak storm that brushed Mexico as a tropical depression, causing flooding and mudslides.

Hettie
 1982 – 
 1992 – did not areas land.
 2009 – did not directly affect any inhabited land areas.

Higos
2002 – considered the fifth strongest typhoon to affect Tokyo since World War II.
2008 – a tropical storm affect Philippines and China.
2015 – an early strong typhoon of the 2015 season.
2020 – a strong tropical storm that affected Mainland China, Hong Kong, Macau and Vietnam around the same area as Nuri two months prior. 

Hilary
1966 –
1967 –
1971 –
1975 –
1981 – 
1987 –
1993 – a Category 3 hurricane that caused significant flooding in the Midwestern United States in August 1993.
1999 –
2005 – formed near Mexico and moved parallel to it
2011 – a powerful tropical cyclone that caused significant flooding in southwestern Mexico in late September 2011.
2017 – 

Hilda
1955 – a strong category 3 hurricane that was the second in a succession of three hurricanes to strike near Tampico, Mexico.
1963 – a short-lived storm that originated in the Mozambique Channel and moved south-southeastward.
1964 – an intense tropical cyclone that ravaged areas of the United States Gulf Coast, particularly Louisiana.
1979 –
1985 –
1990 – 
1991 –
1997 –
1999 – brought heavy rain to Sabah.
2003 –
2009 –
2015 –
2017 – a category 2 tropical cyclone. Wind and flooding damage was reported along the coast in Broome.
2021 –

 Hinnamnor (2022) – a powerful tropical cyclone that recently impacted South Korea.

Hollanda (1994) – the worst tropical cyclone in Mauritius in 19 years.

Hina
1985 – one of the most intense tropical cyclones ever recorded in the South Pacific basin.
1997 – a category 1 tropical cyclone to affect the South Pacific island nation of Tonga since Cyclone Isaac in 1982.
2009 – not areas land

Holly
 1969 – minimal hurricane that moved through the Lesser Antilles as a tropical depression
 1976 – minimal hurricane that remained over open waters
 1981 – moderate tropical storm which formed and remained fairly close to the equator throughout its duration.
 1984 – brought heavy rainfall and caused severe damage to the Korean Peninsula, causing one death
 1987 – attained super typhoon status, but remained away from land.

Hope
1976 – churned out at sea.
1978 – remained over the open ocean.
1979 – a category 4 super typhoon, brushed Taiwan then struck southern China; subsequently restrengthened to a severe tropical storm in the Bay of Bengal.
1982 – struck Vietnam.
1985 – threatened Luzon but turned north and eastward out to sea.

 Hortense
 1973 – a powerful tropical storm passed south of Reunion, bringing rain to the island after hitting Madagascar.
 1984 – meandered over Bermuda as a tropical storm, causing no reported damage.
 1990 – disrupted by interaction with Hurricane Gustav.
 1996 – damaging and deadly cyclone that passed over Guadeloupe and Puerto Rico, and grazed the eastern Dominican Republic and the Turks and Caicos Islands.

Howard
1980 – threatened the coasts of Southern California and the northern part of the Baja California Peninsula, but in the end never approached land. 
1986 – never affected land.
1992 – never affected land.
1998 – never affected land.
2004 – a powerful Category 4 hurricane which produced large swells along the coasts of the Baja California Peninsula and southern California.
2016 – the remnants of the system moved through the main group of Hawaiian Islands where there were light rains that led to floods that occurred in the northwest of Oahu and in the northern parts of Maui.
2022 – never affected land.

Huaning
1964 — struck the Philippines
1968 —
1972 —
1976 — 
1980 —
1984 —
1988 — struck the Philippines and China during July. 
1992 —
1996 — struck the Ryūkyū Islands, Taiwan and the People's Republic of China, causing major damage.
2000 —
2001 —
2005 —
2009 —
2013 — a powerful tropical cyclone that caused widespread damage in Taiwan and East China in July.
2017 —
2021 — a tropical storm that affected Hong Kong and Macau, while also impacting the Guangdong and Fujian provinces in Mainland China, Taiwan and Japan in early August.

Hugo (1989) – a powerful Cape Verde tropical cyclone that inflicted widespread damage across the northeastern Caribbean and the Southeastern United States in September 1989. 

Huko (2002) –

Humberto
1995 – reached Category 2 Strength but remained in open sea.
2001 – passed near Bermuda but caused no damage.
2007 – made landfall in Texas as a strong Category 1 hurricane, causing one death and $50 million in damage.
2013 – affected the Cape Verde Islands; the first of only two hurricanes in the 2013 season.
2019 – Category 3 hurricane that impacted Bermuda.
2022 – a rare subtropical storm that formed off the coast of Chile and remained at sea.

Hyacinth
 1960 - made landfall on western Mexico as a depression.
 1968 - struck Sinaloa, unknown damage.
 1972 - a category 3 at peak; Made landfall in California as a weak depression, caused high surf.
 1976 - a category 3, remained over open waters.

Hyacinthe (1980) – wettest tropical cyclone ever recorded, dropped nearly twenty feet of rain in a caldera on Réunion and 3.3 feet in other areas.

See also

Tropical cyclone
Tropical cyclone naming
European windstorm names
Atlantic hurricane season
List of Pacific hurricane seasons
South Atlantic tropical cyclone

References

General

 
 
 
 
 
 
 
 
 
 
 
 
 
 
 
 
 

 
 
 
 
 

H